John Lloyd Espidol Cruz is a multi award-winning Filipino actor, model and occasional TV host.

On July 30, 2008, Cruz starred with Sarah Geronimo in A Very Special Love under Star Cinema and Viva Films. The film grossed PHP 179,569,117 at the box office.

In February 2009, Cruz's follow-up movie with Sarah Geronimo, You Changed My Life, hit the box office. The film was the sequel to A Very Special Love, and was also produced by Star Cinema and Viva Films. The film's total theatrical earnings reached PHP 240.44 million and is ranked as the 4th "Highest Top-Grossing Filipino Film of All Time".

He was eventually hailed as the "Box-Office King" for two consecutive years: in 2007 for the film, One More Chance, and in 2008 with the film, A Very Special Love. Success followed in 2009 with the film, You Changed My Life, which became the top-grossing film of his career.

On February 24, 2010, John Lloyd's reunion movie with Bea Alonzo, Miss You Like Crazy, a box office hit too. In the first showing day, they already had P18 million. John Lloyd here played the role of Allan Alvarez, with Bea Alonzo as Mia Samonte. MYLC is said as the best movie of the year.

Awards

Film and television awards

Box-office and entertainment industry awards and special awards

Nominations

Film nominations

Television nominations

Box-office and entertainment industry awards and special nominations

References

Lists of awards received by Filipino actor